Gagata melanopterus is a species of sisorid catfish endemic to Myanmar where it occurs in the Irrawaddy, Sittang and lower Salween River basins.  This species grows to a length of  SL.

References

External links

Sisoridae
Fish of Myanmar
Endemic fauna of Myanmar
Fish described in 1998